Carroll Thackston (June 20, 1933 – February 17, 2013) was a United States Army major general and former Adjutant General of Virginia.

Early life and education
Thackston was born on June 20, 1933 in Concord, Virginia to Mr. and Mrs. Richard M. Thackston. He attended Virginia Military Institute and graduated in 1955 with a degree in history.

Dates of promotion
2LT USAR 	7 Jun 55
1LT USAR 	6 Jun 58
1LT ARNG 	22 Apr 63
CPT ARNG 	27 Jan 70
MAJ ARNG 	4 Aug 65
LTC ARNG 	11 Jun 76
COL ARNG 	24 Nov 82
BG (AGC) ARNG 	15 Sep 89
MG (AGC) ARNG 	22 Jun 95

References

1933 births
2013 deaths
United States Army generals
National Guard (United States) generals
Virginia National Guard personnel